Toano may refer to:

Places
 Toano, Reggio Emilia, Emilia-Romagna, Italy, a comune
 Toano, Nevada, United States, a ghost town
 Toano, Virginia, United States, an unincorporated community
 Toano Middle School
 Toano Range, a mountain range in Elko County, Nevada, United States

Other uses
 Foton Toano, a 2015–present Chinese van